Rosenbergia vetusta is a species of beetle in the family Cerambycidae. It was described by Ritsema in 1881. It is known from Papua New Guinea.

References

Batocerini
Beetles described in 1881